On many occasions spanning over a century, leaders of the Church of Jesus Christ of Latter-day Saints (LDS Church) have taught that suicide is against the will of God, though, Church teachings on suicide have changed through the years. One of the earliest recorded explicit mentions by a top church leader was by George Q. Cannon in the First Presidency who stated in an 1893 editorial to LDS youth that "Every  member  of  the  Church  should be  made  to  understand  that  it  is  a dreadful  sin  to  take  one’s  own  life.  It  is self-murder ...." He echoed this stating, "They who do so are guilty of murder, self-murder it is true ... no one can destroy so precious a gift as that of life without incurring a severe penalty." Cannon recorded that the First Presidency decided those who died by suicide would not receive an honorable burial in their LDS temple robes as was customary for endowed members. In 1987 the apostle M. Russell Ballard also stated that those who die by suicide have "committed a very serious sin, and some consequences of it may remain with them throughout eternity." Church seventy Bruce R. McConkie wrote in his highly influential LDS bestseller Mormon Doctrine that "Suicide is murder, pure and simple, and murderers are damned." In the 2011 LDS Beliefs: A Doctrinal Reference published by the church, the section on suicide called it "self-murder" and stated that, "modern prophets and apostles have likewise spoken clearly about the seriousness of murder, including self-murder and the severity of consequences associated therewith." The LDS Church opposes physician-assisted suicide and euthanasia.

Church suicide prevention efforts

In June 2016 the church published its official Mental Health website followed shortly in September 2016 by its official Preventing Suicide website. In April 2018, the LDS Church donated $150,000 to the state of Utah to aid in suicide prevention. In July 2018, the LDS Church donated $25,000 to the LGBT advocacy group Affirmation: LGBT Mormons, Families & Friends to aid in worldwide suicide prevention training.

Leader statements on LGBT Mormon suicides

The LDS Church released a statement through spokesman Dale Jones on 28 January 2016 mourning the reported suicides of 32 LGBT Mormons. The release stated that leaders and members are taught to "reach out in an active, caring way to all, especially to youth who feel estranged or isolated." On 9 February 2016 when apostle Dallin H. Oaks was asked about church leaders and members' responsibility for the treatment of LGBT individuals that may have precipitated in suicides he stated "that's a question that will be answered on judgment day" and that "nobody is sadder about a case like that than I am."

References

Suicide
Church of Jesus Christ of Latter-day Saints
Church of Jesus Christ of Latter-day Saints
Church of Jesus Christ of Latter-day Saints
Church teachings on suicide